The 2017 Pan American Men's Club Handball Championship the X edition of this tournament took place in Villa Ballester, Buenos Aires, Argentina from 24 to 28 May 2017. It acts as a qualifying tournament for the 2017 IHF Super Globe.

Participating teams
 SAG Villa Ballester
 UNLu
 Handebol Taubaté
 EC Pinheiros
 Ovalle Balonmano
 Colegio Alemán

Results

Round robin
All times are local (UTC-03:00).

Final standing

Awards
All-star team
Goalkeeper:  Marcos Paulo Santos
Right Wing:  Andrés Kogovsek
Right Back:  Federico Pizarro
Playmaker:  André Silva
Left Back:  Leonardo Dutra
Left Wing:  André Soares
Pivot:  Vinícius Teixeira
MVP:  Federico Pizarro

References

External links
Official Web Site
Pan American Handball Confederation website

Pan American Men's Club Handball Championship
Pan American Men's Club Handball Championship
Pan American Men's Club Handball Championship
H
Sport in Buenos Aires Province
May 2017 sports events in South America